Maurice Holmes may refer to:

 Maurice Holmes (harness racer) (1909–1998), driver of standardbred racehorses in New Zealand
 Maurice Holmes (cricketer) (born 1990), English cricketer
 Sir Maurice Holmes (barrister) (1911–1997), barrister and Chairman of the London Transport Board
 Sir Maurice Gerald Holmes (1885–1964), British civil servant